Santrash is a 2003 Indian Bengali-language thriller drama film directed by Narayan Roy, starring Mithun Chakraborty, Madhabi Mukherjee, Ranjit Mallick.

Plot
A fast-paced thriller, with Mithun in the lead. Rajib is a corrupt minister and terrorizes the city.His goons kill Shubhankar's brother and also kill the lone witness. Tormented, Shubhankar searches for a man who can fight Rajib

Cast
 Mithun Chakraborty as Montu
 Usasi Misra 
 Ranjit Mallick
 Madhabi Mukherjee as Montu's Mother
 Locket Chatterjee as Locket
 Narayan Roy as Chayan
 Pushpita Banerjee
 Rahul Barman as Ratan
 Raja Chattopadhyay
 Rimita Roy
 Mrinal Mukherjee as Minister Rajib Chowdhury
 Jayanta Dutta Barman As Rajiv
 Mrityun Hazra as Kidnapper
 Debnath Chaterjee
 Chandu Chowdhury

References

2003 films
2000s Bengali-language films
2003 thriller drama films
Mithun's Dream Factory films
Bengali-language Indian films
Films shot in Ooty
Indian thriller drama films